4th Mounted Brigade may refer to:
4th (London) Mounted Brigade, designation given to the London Mounted Brigade while serving with the 2nd Mounted Division in the Gallipoli Campaign
4th Mounted Brigade (United Kingdom), also known as 2/1st South Wales Mounted Brigade